Pseudoscada is a genus of clearwing (ithomiine) butterflies, named by Frederick DuCane Godman and Osbert Salvin in [1879]. They are in the brush-footed butterfly family, Nymphalidae.

Species
Arranged alphabetically:
Pseudoscada acilla (Hewitson, 1867)
Pseudoscada erruca (Hewitson, 1855)
Pseudoscada florula (Hewitson, 1855)
Pseudoscada timna (Hewitson, 1855)

References 

Ithomiini
Nymphalidae of South America
Nymphalidae genera
Taxa named by Frederick DuCane Godman
Taxa named by Osbert Salvin